August F. Haw  is the shortened placename designated by the United States Postal Service for a South Los Angeles area associated with ZIP codes 90002, 90044, 90051, 90059, and 90061.

It is a corruption of the name of the Augustus F. Hawkins Natural Park, which was recently built in a highly urbanized area of south LA.  The park itself is named after former Congressman Augustus Freeman "Gus" Hawkins.

This corrupted name is recognized on an information pass-through basis by a variety of government agencies, including state agencies such as the Southern California Air Quality Management District and the Medical Board of California, and the federal government.

The name is also widely used in commercial databases.

References

Neighborhoods in Los Angeles
South Los Angeles